KPAM (860 AM) is a commercial radio station broadcasting a conservative talk radio format. Licensed to Troutdale, Oregon, it serves the Portland metropolitan area. The station is owned by the Salem Media Group, with radio studios and offices on SE Lake Road in Portland.  It is branded as "860 The Answer" and carries  nationally syndicated Salem Radio Network hosts including Dennis Prager, Mike Gallagher, Sebastian Gorka, Hugh Hewitt and Charlie Kirk.

By day, KPAM broadcasts at 50,000 watts non-directional, the highest power permitted by the Federal Communications Commission (FCC).  But because 860 kHz is a Canadian clear channel frequency, KPAM must reduce power to 15,000 watts at night, and use a directional antenna, to avoid interfering with CJBC Toronto, the Class A station on the frequency.  The transmitter is on NE 34th Street in Vancouver, Washington.

History
It was owned by Pamplin Broadcasting, from which it gets its call sign. The station had a talk radio format from its founding. It carried world and national news updates from ABC Radio News.

In 2018, Pamplin Broadcasting sold the station to Salem Media. On April 2, 2018, KPAM rebranded as "860 The Answer".  It began airing the line up of Salem Radio Network programs.

References

External links

PAM
Talk radio stations in the United States
Conservative talk radio
Radio stations established in 1997
1997 establishments in Oregon
Salem Media Group properties